Success Express (foaled February 25, 1985 in Kentucky – 24 April 2015) was an American Thoroughbred racehorse.

Background
Success Express was a bay horse bred by Tri Star Stable. During his racing career he was owned by Eugene V. Klein and trained by future U.S. Racing Hall of Fame inductee D. Wayne Lukas.

Racing career
At age two Success Express won four of his eight starts. The colt capped off his year with his only Graded Stakes win under jockey José A. Santos in the 1987 Breeders' Cup Juvenile at Hollywood Park Racetrack. Success Express was winless in nine starts at age three with his best result a second in the Grade II Bay Shore Stakes at Aqueduct Racetrack.

Stud career
In 1989, Success Express was retired to stud in Australia and spent two seasons in New Zealand between 1991 and 1993. There, he has sired multiple stakes winning millionaire, Staging, as well as Polar Success whose career earnings were more than $2 million and who was a multiple stakes winner including the Group One Golden Slipper Stakes.

Pedigree

References

1985 racehorse births
2015 racehorse deaths
Racehorses bred in Kentucky
Racehorses trained in the United States
Breeders' Cup Juvenile winners
Thoroughbred family 17-b